The following articles contain lists of numbered highways in the U.S. state of Washington:

List of Interstate Highways in Washington
List of U.S. Routes in Washington
List of state routes in Washington